The 1800s (pronounced "eighteen-hundreds") was a decade of the Gregorian calendar that began on January 1, 1800, and ended on December 31, 1809. The term "eighteen-hundreds" can also mean the entire century from January 1, 1800 to December 31, 1899 (the years beginning with "18"), and is almost synonymous with the 19th century (1801–1900). This article refers to the decade comprising 1800–1809.

The decade was a period of drastic change. The advancements of the previous three decades towards the end of the 18th century had propelled the Industrial Revolution into a global movement, with entire wars fought with the newly developed technologies – creating an impetus to imperialist campaigns across Africa and Asia, as well as the counter-movement on Latin America later on.

Politics and wars

Napoleonic Wars

The European political landscape was dominated by the Napoleonic Wars, a series of conflicts declared against Napoleon's First French Empire and changing sets of European allies by opposing coalitions that ran from 1803 to 1815. As a continuation of the wars sparked by the French Revolution of 1789, they revolutionized European armies and played out on an unprecedented scale, mainly due to the application of modern mass conscription. French power rose quickly, conquering most of Europe by the end of the decade. The decade brought hard times.

On 9 November 1799 (18 Brumaire), Napoleon overthrew the French government, replacing it with the Consulate, in which he was First Consul. On 2 December 1804, after a failed assassination plot, he crowned himself Emperor. In 1805, Napoleon planned to invade Britain, but a renewed British alliance with Russia and Austria (Third Coalition), forced him to turn his attention towards the continent, while at the same time failure to lure the superior British fleet away from the English Channel, ending in a decisive French defeat at the Battle of Trafalgar (in this battle, British Admiral Horatio Nelson was fatally wounded) on 21 October put an end to hopes of an invasion of Britain. On 2 December 1805, Napoleon defeated a numerically superior Austro-Russian army at Austerlitz, forcing Austria's withdrawal from the coalition (see Treaty of Pressburg) and dissolving the Holy Roman Empire. In 1806, a Fourth Coalition was set up, on 14 October Napoleon defeated the Prussians at the Battle of Jena-Auerstedt, marched through Germany and defeated the Russians on 14 June 1807 at  Friedland. The Treaties of Tilsit divided Europe between France and Russia and created the Duchy of Warsaw.

The War of the Fifth Coalition, fought in the year 1809, pitted a coalition of the Austrian Empire and the United Kingdom against the French Empire and Bavaria. Major engagements between France and Austria, the main participants, unfolded over much of Central Europe from April to July, with very high casualty rates. Britain, already involved on the European continent in the ongoing Peninsular War, sent another expedition, the Walcheren Campaign, to the Netherlands in order to relieve the Austrians, although this effort had little impact on the outcome of the conflict. After much campaigning in Bavaria and across the Danube valley, the war ended favorably for the French after the bloody struggle at Wagram in early July, resulting in the Treaty of Schönbrunn . Although fighting in the Iberian Peninsula continued, the War of the Fifth Coalition was the last major conflict on the European continent until the French invasion of Russia in 1812 sparked the Sixth Coalition.

Other wars and political upheavals
 End of the White Lotus Rebellion (1796–1804), an uprising against the Qing Dynasty in China.
 Beginning of the Russo-Turkish War (1806–1812) between Russia and the Ottoman Empire.
 The First Barbary War (1801–1805) is fought between the United States and the Barbary States of North Africa.
 End of the Quasi-War (1800).
 The Second Anglo-Maratha War (1803–1805) is fought between the Maratha Peshwa on one side and minor chieftains of the Maratha Confederacy Sindhia, Bhonsle and Holkar on the other resulting in a crushing defeat of the rebel chieftains and the breakup of the Maratha confederacy.
 The Fulani War (1804–1810) is fought in present-day Nigeria and Cameroon.
 The First Serbian Uprising (1804−1813) marks the first time in 300 years Serbia perceives itself an independent state.
 Haiti gains independence from France on January 1, 1804.
 Irish Republican, orator, and rebel leader Robert Emmet leads a rebellion in Dublin, Ireland on 23 July 1803 but the rebellion is crushed and Emmet is captured and later executed on 20 September 1803.

1800s
1 Jan 1800 – 31 Dec 1809
The 1800s was a decade of the Gregorian calendar that began on January 1, 1800, and ended on December 31, 1809. It was a decade of drastic change to the world.

Slavery

This decade marked the greatest increase of the Atlantic slave trade to the United States. During the period of 1798 and 1808, approximately 200,000 slaves were imported from Africa to the United States. Still, the abolitionist movement began to gain ground in this period. Britain enacted the Slave Trade Act 1807, which barred the trade of slaves in Great Britain (though slavery was still legal). The United States enacted a similar ban in 1808. However, Napoleon revoked the French Empire's ban on slavery with the Law of 20 May 1802.

On 30 August 1800, under the cloak of religious meetings, Gabriel Prosser and Jack Bowler planned a slave rebellion in Richmond, Virginia. The rebellion was postponed due to poor weather and was ultimately unsuccessful because of unnamed two slaves betraying the cause.

Prominent political events
 1800
 The unfinished White House (at the time known as the "Executive Mansion") housed its first president, President John Adams, on 1 November 1800.
 1801
 Under the District of Columbia Organic Act of 1801, Washington, D.C., a new planned city and capital of the United States, was placed under the jurisdiction of the U.S. Congress.
 The Kingdom of Great Britain and the Kingdom of Ireland merge into the United Kingdom of Great Britain and Ireland in 1801.
 1803
 United States doubles its size with territories gained from Napoleon Bonaparte in the Louisiana Purchase.

World leaders
1800 – 1801 – 1802 – 1803 – 1804 – 1805 – 1806 – 1807 – 1808 – 1809

Colonies

Science and technology

Electricity

This decade contained some of the earliest experiments in electrochemistry. In 1800 Alessandro Volta constructed a voltaic pile, the first device to produce a large electric current, later known as the electric battery. Napoleon, informed of his works, summoned him in 1801 for a command performance of his experiments. He received many medals and decorations, including the Légion d'honneur.

Also in 1800, William Nicholson and Johann Wilhelm Ritter succeeded in decomposing water into hydrogen and oxygen by electrolysis. Soon thereafter Ritter discovered the process of electroplating. He also observed that the amount of metal deposited and the amount of oxygen produced during an electrolytic process depended on the distance between the electrodes. By 1801 Ritter observed thermoelectric currents and anticipated the discovery of thermoelectricity by Thomas Johann Seebeck.

In 1806, Humphry Davy decomposed potash and soda, employing a voltaic pile of approximately 250 cells, showing that these substances were respectively the oxides of potassium and sodium, which metals previously had been unknown. Employing a battery of 2,000 elements of a voltaic pile and charcoal enclosed in a vacuum, Davy gave the first public demonstration of the electric arc lamp in 1809.

Steam transportation started to become viable during this decade. In 1803, William Symington's Charlotte Dundas, generally considered to be the world's first practical steamboat, made her first voyage. Later, in 1807, Robert Fulton's North River Steamboat, the world's first commercially successful steamboat, made her maiden voyage.

In 1801, Richard Trevithick ran a full-sized steam 'road locomotive' on the road in Camborne, England, followed by his 10-seater London Steam Carriage in 1803. In 1804, Trevithick built a prototype steam-powered railway locomotive.

The first railway began operating during this time. The Surrey Iron Railway in Great Britain was established by the British Parliament in 1801, and began operation on 26 July 1803. The railway relied on horse-drawn haulage than powered locomotives.

In 1807, Isaac de Rivas made a hydrogen gas-powered vehicle, the first vehicle powered by an internal combustion engine.
James Watt creates first steam engine based on Newcomen's design.

Astronomy
 The first known asteroids are discovered in this decade:
 Ceres (January 1, 1801). Ceres is reclassified as a dwarf planet in 2006.
 Pallas (March 28, 1802)
 Juno (September 1, 1804)
 Vesta (March 29, 1807)

Other advances
 Invention of the Jacquard loom in 1801.
 Ultraviolet radiation is discovered by Johann Wilhelm Ritter in 1801.
 Flag semaphore is gradually adopted by various navies of the world.
 Morphine is isolated from opium for the first time in 1804.
 Nicolas Appert develops a method to preserve food by means of canning in 1809.
 John Dalton publishes his atomic theory 1803.

Culture
 The end of the Enlightenment following the beginning of the Romantic era in the next decade.

Music
 Ludwig van Beethoven's Symphony No. 1 premiers in Vienna in 1800.
 Bach's Sonatas and partitas for solo violin are published by Bote and Bock in 1802.
 Symphony No. 3 'Eroica' by Ludwig van Beethoven is completed in 1804.
 Fidelio by Ludwig van Beethoven is completed in 1805.
 Fourth Piano Concerto and Violin Concerto by Ludwig van Beethoven are completed in 1806.
 La Vestale by Gaspare Spontini is completed in 1807.
 Beethoven completes both his 5th Symphony and 6th Symphony "Pastoral" in 1808.

Fashion

Fashion in this period in European and European-influenced countries saw the final triumph of undress or informal styles over the brocades, lace, periwig, and powder of the earlier eighteenth century.

 Fashionable women's clothing styles were based on the Empire silhouette — dresses were closely fitted to the torso just under the bust, falling loosely below. Inspired by neoclassical tastes, the short-waisted gowns sported soft, flowing skirts and were often made of white, almost transparent muslin, which was easily washed and draped loosely like the garments on Greek and Roman statues. No respectable woman would leave the house without a hat or bonnet. The antique head-dress, or Queen Mary coif, Chinese hat, Oriental inspired turban, and Highland helmet were popular. As for bonnets, their crowns and brims were adorned with increasingly elaborate ornamentations, such as feathers and ribbons. In fact, ladies of the day embellished their hats frequently, replacing old decorations with new trims or feathers.

1800–1809 was the height of dandyism in men's fashion in Europe, following the example of Beau Brummell. Older men, military officers, and those in conservative professions such as lawyers and physicians retained their wigs and powder into this period, but younger men of fashion wore their hair in short curls, often with long sideburns. This period saw the final abandonment of lace, embroidery, and other embellishment from serious men's clothing outside of formalized court dress. Instead, cut and tailoring became much more important as an indicator of quality.

Other
 November 10, 1809 – Berners Street hoax: Theodore Hook manages to attract dozens of people to 54 Berners Street in London.

Wikisource reference work
 History that in part contains six chapters of narration remarking upon significant individuals of that era with added wikilinks linking back to their Wikipedia articles

References